Čabalovce is a village and municipality in the Medzilaborce District in the Prešov Region of far north-eastern Slovakia.

History
In historical records the village was first mentioned in 1494.

Geography
The municipality lies at an altitude of 400 metres and covers an area of 21.403 km². It has a population of about 365 people.

Genealogical resources
The records for genealogical research are available at the state archive "Statny Archiv in Kosice, Presov, Slovakia"

 Roman Catholic church records (births/marriages/deaths): 1786-1898 (parish B)

See also
 List of municipalities and towns in Slovakia

References

External links
 
http://www.statistics.sk/mosmis/eng/run.html
Surnames of living people in Cabalovce

Villages and municipalities in Medzilaborce District
Zemplín (region)